October 1970 may refer to:
 October 1970 (month)
 The October Crisis, a terrorism incident in Quebec
 October 1970 (film), a TV miniseries based on the October Crisis